Charles Southern Hope (9 November 1837 — 18 March 1916) was an English first-class cricketer and tea broker.

The son of Charles Hope, he was born in November 1837. He was educated at Winchester College, where he described by Wisden as "one of the best players in the [cricket] eleven". He played first-class cricket for the Marylebone Cricket Club on four occasions in 1858 and 1859, making three appearances against Cambridge University and one appearance against Oxford University. He scored 26 runs in these matches, in addition to taking a single wicket. By profession, Hope was a tea broker in China and Japan from 1859 to 1867. He died at Kensington in March 1916.

References

External links

1837 births
1916 deaths
People educated at Winchester College
English cricketers
Marylebone Cricket Club cricketers